Samarjit Nath (born 1 November 1981 in Bongaigaon, Assam) was an Indian cricketer. He was a right-handed batsman and wicket-keeper who played for Assam.

Nath made his cricketing debut in the 1997-98 Vijay Merchant Trophy, becoming one of the only players in the Under-16 team to play first-class cricket.

The following season, he played for the Under-19s in the Cooch Behar Trophy, a competition in which he played for two seasons.

Nath made his only first-class appearance in the 2001-02 Ranji Trophy season, against Tripura.  From the tailend, he scored 12 not out in the only innings in which he batted. As a wicket-keeper, he took ten catches and took one stumping.

External links
Samarjit Nath at CricketArchive 

1981 births
Living people
Indian cricketers
Assam cricketers
People from Bongaigaon district
Cricketers from Assam
Wicket-keepers